Saarde may refer to several places in Estonia:

Saarde Parish, municipality in Pärnu County
Saarde, Pärnu County, village in Saarde Parish, Pärnu County
Saarde, Võru County, village in Vastseliina Parish, Võru County